Arnold Gilkes (born 26 February 1958) is a Barbadian cricketer. He played in eleven first-class and five List A matches for the Barbados cricket team from 1975 to 1988.

See also
 List of Barbadian representative cricketers

References

External links
 

1958 births
Living people
Barbadian cricketers
Barbados cricketers
People from Saint Thomas, Barbados